Limp Records was an independent record label in Rockville, Maryland, that operated from 1978 to 1982. Run by Skip Groff out of his Yesterday and Today Records store, Limp was one of the first labels releasing music from the nascent D.C. punk scene. The label's more notable output includes the first Bad Brains release (a song on The Best of Limp (…Rest of Limp)), the second Minor Threat record (a split release with Dischord), and the first record by Black Market Baby. The label's first release was the Slickee Boys second EP.

Much like Stiff Records had Devo's "Be Stiff," a song entitled "Stay Limp" by the Raisinets was included on Limp's :30 Over DC compilation.

Slogans
On the :30 Over DC album, there are slogans next to the logos on each side of the record. Next to the square logo it says "Limp Records—our business is fitting squares onto round holes." Next to the round logo it says "Limp Records hang a round  on spindles all day."

Run-out groove messages
The following records have messages etched onto its run-out grooves:
LIMP 005 a-side: "Slickee delic." b-side: "We try to play it you try to like it"
LIMP 007 both sides: "It shoulda been mono"
LIMP 011 a-side: "Read Discords" b-side: "Still only 10¢"
LIMP 030 a-side: "This side's for Rusty" b-side: "This side's for Skip"
LIMP 035 a-side: "Remember Snitch" b-side: "Who's Snitch?"
LIMP 041 a-side: "Hi Henry. Hi Lyle. Never forget" b-side: "There's no place like home"
LIMP 1005 a-side: "You can't always get what you want, so send money!" b-side: "Six on one, half dozen on the other, plus two to go"
INT01 a-side: "Limp Records 'Ideologically sound'" b-side: "Limp Records 'Idea logically sound'"

Discography

External links 
 :30 Under DC – Annotated discography with comments from label owner Skip Groff.

See also 
 List of record labels

Record labels established in 1978
Record labels disestablished in 1982
American independent record labels
Alternative rock record labels